Mohsen Kaedi (born 19 April 1987) is a para-athlete from Iran competing mainly in category F34 throwing events. He has competed at two Summer Paralympics, winning a gold medal in the F33-34 javelin at the 2012 Games in London.

Career history
Kaedi took up throwing events in 2004, whilst still living in Khorramabad. Kaedi, who has cerebral palsy, was classified as a F35 field athlete allowing him to compete in IPC sanctioned events. He made his senior international debut for Iran at the 2006 IPC Athletics World Championships held in Assen in the Netherlands. There he entered the F35 discus, finishing fourth with a distance of 41.55m.

Two years later Kaedi qualified for his first Summer Paralympics, travelling to China to compete in the 2008 Games at Beijing in the javelin. His best throw in the F35/36 javelin was 42.61m, converted to 975 points, which left him in fifth place. His first major international success came at the inaugural 2010 Asian Para Games, where he took silver in the F35/36 javelin.

Kaedi's next major tournament was the 2012 Summer Paralympics held in London. By now he had been reclassified and was competing in the F34 classification for athletes with a more severe impairment. He entered both the F34 shot put and the F33-34 javelin, winning silver in the shot put and gold in the javelin.

References

Paralympic athletes of Iran
Paralympic gold medalists for Iran
Living people
World record holders in Paralympic athletics
Athletes (track and field) at the 2008 Summer Paralympics
Athletes (track and field) at the 2012 Summer Paralympics
Athletes (track and field) at the 2016 Summer Paralympics
Paralympic silver medalists for Iran
Paralympic bronze medalists for Iran
Medalists at the 2008 Summer Paralympics
Medalists at the 2012 Summer Paralympics
Medalists at the 2016 Summer Paralympics
1987 births
People from Khorramabad
Paralympic medalists in athletics (track and field)
Iranian male javelin throwers
Iranian male shot putters
21st-century Iranian people
Medalists at the 2010 Asian Para Games
Medalists at the 2014 Asian Para Games
Medalists at the 2018 Asian Para Games